Pearse may refer to:

 Pearse (surname), includes list of people with the name
 Pearse Island, an island on the north coast of British Columbia, Canada
 Pearse Islands, a small archipelago at the northern entrance to Johnstone Strait, near Alert Bay, British Columbia, Canada
 Pearse Peninsula, Broughton Island
 Pearse Museum, Dublin, Ireland
 Pearse River, Tasman, New Zealand
 Pearse Strait, Nunavut, Canada

See also
 Pearse Park (disambiguation)
 
 
 Pearce (disambiguation)
 Peirce (disambiguation)